The following is a list of athletes with dual nationality. It includes both players who can trace their origins to a foreign country and those who have attained foreign nationality during their career, as well as players who hail from semi-autonomous regions within countries.

Athletics

Auto racing

Baseball

Basketball

Boxing

Cycling

Fencing

Field hockey

Football (Association)

Football (Gridiron)

Ice hockey (Junior)

Ice hockey (Senior)

Kickboxing

Rugby (league & union)

Skating

Swimming

Tennis

Weightlifting

See also
List of nationality transfers in sport
Oriundo

References

Dual nationality